Claudirene Maria César (born February 7, 1985, in São José dos Campos, São Paulo) is a judoka from Brazil.

Biography
César was born in São José dos Campos and begun with judo in 7. Three years later she was already champion of São Paulo region.

She is one of the best Brazilian judoka in heavyweight category but usually second or third in the team. She is often injured like in beginning of 2006 when she was out for 3 months with a dislocated arm.

Judo
She won silver and bronze medal at 2009 Pan American Judo Championships in half-heavyweight category.

Achievements

References

External links 
  (*July 7, 1985)

1985 births
Living people
Brazilian female judoka
Universiade medalists in judo
Universiade bronze medalists for Brazil
Medalists at the 2011 Summer Universiade
People from São José dos Campos
Sportspeople from São Paulo (state)